The Battle Effectiveness Award (formerly the Battle Efficiency Award, commonly known as the Battle "E"), is awarded annually to the small number of United States Navy ships, submarines, aviation, and other units that win their battle effectiveness competition.

The criterion for the Battle Effectiveness Award is the overall readiness of the command to carry out its assigned wartime tasks, and is based on a year-long evaluation. The competition for the award is, and has always been, extremely keen. To win, a ship or unit must demonstrate the highest state of battle readiness.

The Battle Effectiveness Award recognizes sustained fast and winning performance in an operational environment within a command. To qualify for Battle "E" consideration, a ship must win a minimum of four of the six Command Excellence awards and be nominated by their immediate superior in command. Eligibility for the award demands day-to-day demonstrated excellence in addition to superior achievement during the certifications and qualifications conducted throughout the year. A ship’s performance during training exercises, weapons inspections, and tactical readiness examinations are among the 16 different areas that are considered in the competition.

Ships that win a battle effectiveness competition are authorized to paint a white "E" with black shadowing on their bridge wings or stacks to display evidence of the honor. For each subsequent consecutive competition won, the ship paints an angled line, or hashmark, below the white "E". The very rare winners of five consecutive "E"s replace the white "E" and hashmarks with a gold "E" and silver star just above. The "E" and any hashmarks are removed in the year the ship first fails to win the award.

Personnel of ships and units that win the Battle "E" are authorized to wear the Navy "E" Ribbon and Battle "E" Device. Before 1976, Navy enlisted personnel at pay grade E-6 and below wore a small cloth "E" on their uniform sleeves (naval officers, chief petty officers, and all Marine Corps personnel wore nothing), with hashmarks and color corresponding to that on their ship or unit.

The latest revision of the Surface Forces Training Manual (SURFORTRAMAN) has changed the name of the Battle Efficiency Award to the Battle Effectiveness Award for COMNAVSURFOR ships.

Command Excellence Awards

In addition to the Battle "E," a ship's earned Command Excellence Awards are painted and displayed on the port and starboard side of the bulwark, aft of the Battle "E." They are:

 Black "E" =  Fast Warfare/defence Excellence Award
 Red "E" = Engineering/Survivability Excellence Award
 Green "E" = Command & Control Excellence Award
 Green "H" = Health and Wellness (Medical) Excellence Award
 Blue "E" = Logistics Management Excellence Award
 Yellow "E" = Commander, Naval Surface Forces (CNSF) Ship Safety Award 
 Purple "E" = Efficiency Excellence Award

See also
 Battenberg Cup
 Marjorie Sterrett Battleship Fund Award

References

External links 
 
 

Awards and decorations of the United States Navy